Danish Agro is a cooperative farm supply company headquartered in Karise south of Copenhagen, Denmark. It is owned by 12,000 Danish farmers.

History
Danish Agro traces its history back to 1901, when Stevns Foderstofforening was founded on the Stevns Peninsula. Since then the company has been through numerous mergers, and in 2006 it changed its name to Danish Agro.

In the autumn of 2009, Danish Agro took over its competitor, Landbrugets Andel, when the latter was faced with financial difficulties.

DAVA Agravis International 
DAVA Agravis International Holding A/S is a joint venture between Danish Agro, Vestjyllands Andel and Agravis. In October 2014, the company took over Getreide AGs' retail activities in Germany.

See also
 DLG Group Dansk_Landbrugs_Grovvareselskab

References

External links
 Official website

Retail companies of Denmark

Agriculture companies of Denmark
Wholesalers of Denmark
Food and drink companies of Denmark
Cooperatives in Denmark
Business services companies established in 1901
Companies based in Faxe Municipality
Danish companies established in 1901